Guela may refer to:

 Guela, Congo
Guela, Guinea